Kamalapati Tripathi (3 September 1905 – 8 October 1990) was an Indian politician, writer, journalist, and freedom fighter. He was a senior Indian National Congress leader from Varanasi constituency. He served as Chief Minister of Uttar Pradesh as well as Union Minister for Railways.                  

                             
He also served as the Deputy Chief Minister of Uttar Pradesh from 1969 to 1970 and first and, to date, only Executive President of Indian National Congress from 1983 to 1986.

Family
Kamlapati Tripathi was born in a Saryupareen Brahmin family. He had three sons and two daughters. The eldest son was Lokpati Tripathi who was also a minister in Uttar Pradesh, his second son was Mayapati Tripathi who founded the social organisation by the name of Akhil Bharatiya Kissan Mazdoor Vahini. His youngest son was Manglapati Tripathi (also called Shashipati Tripathi).

Early days

His father's name was Pandit Narayan Pati Tripathi. Originally he belonged to Tripathi Family of Pindi, popularly known as Pindi Tiwarys. He had no connection with Unnao or Kanpur. He belonged to Saryuparin community which essentially has roots in Trans-Saryu Area of Uttar Pradesh. His ancestors settled down in Varanasi during the time of Aurangzeb. He started his career as a journalist working for the daily Hindi newspaper  Aaj and later Sansaar. He was also the editor of the two tabloids. He was married at the age of 19 and had 5 children.

Political career

Indian independence movement
During 1921, Kamalapati Tripathi participated in Non-cooperation Movement. He was also an active participant in the Civil Disobedience Movement, for which he was jailed. In 1942 he was on his way to Mumbai to participate in the Quit India Movement when he was arrested and jailed for 3 years. Kamalapati Tripathi was elected to the Constituent Assembly from United Province on Congress Party ticket and played an important part in the drafting of the Constitution of India.

Chief Minister of Uttar Pradesh
He remained Chief Minister of Uttar Pradesh from 4 April 1971 until 12 June 1973. His resignation was a result of the 1973 Provincial Armed Constabulary revolt.

Union Minister for Railways
He was Union Minister for Railways two times first from 1975 to 1977 and then briefly in 1980. He presented Railway Budget of India four times: 1975–76, 1976–77, 1980–81 (interim) and 1980–81 (final). Following trains were introduced during his tenure:
 Sabarmati Express
 Ganga Kaveri Express
 Neelambari Express
 Varanasi Express (Delhi-Lucknow Exp. extended)
 Tamil Nadu Express
 Kashi Vishwanath Express

An 8-kilometer-long new Railway line between Telapur-Patanchera was opened during his tenure.

The Diesel Loco Shed in Pune was started in his tenure.

Executive President of INC         
After the death of son Sanjay Gandhi in a plane crash, Indira Gandhi made Tripathi the executive president. But, after the Assassination of Indira Gandhi, Rajiv Gandhi sworn in as Congress President and Prime Minister of India, Tripathi made conflict with him. In November 1986, he resigned.

As an author
He authored following works:
Bandi Ki Chetna, 1946
 Bapu aur Bharat,
 Barcode   : 1990010092576
 Country   : India
 Language  : Hindi
 Edition   :   Hardcover (386 pages)
 Publisher :   (1945)
 Bapu aur manawata,
 Barcode   : 1990010092577
 Country   : India
 Language  : Hindi
 Edition   :   Hardcover (413 pages)
 Publisher :   (1945)
 Gandhi and Humanity
 ISBN:   
 Country   : India
 Language  : English
 Edition   : Hardcover (248 pages)
 Publisher :   Atlantic Publishers & Distributors (1993)
 Freedom movement and afterwards
 ISBN:   
 Country   : India
 Language  : English
 Edition   :   Hardcover (228 pages)
 Publisher :   Vishwavidyalaya Prakashan (1989)

References

External links
 Chief Ministers of Uttar Pradesh
 Kamalapati Tripathi - About The Author

Indian National Congress politicians from Uttar Pradesh
Chief Ministers of Uttar Pradesh
1905 births
1990 deaths
India MPs 1980–1984
Politicians from Varanasi
Rajya Sabha members from Uttar Pradesh
Uttar Pradesh MLAs 1969–1974
Indian independence activists from Uttar Pradesh
Railway Ministers of India
Lok Sabha members from Uttar Pradesh
Leaders of the Opposition in the Uttar Pradesh Legislative Assembly
Deputy chief ministers of Uttar Pradesh
Leaders of the Opposition in the Rajya Sabha
Chief ministers from Indian National Congress